Professor Bernard Li, KSG , KHS (黎建球; Hanyu pinyin: Li Jianqiu; 3 June 1943–) is a Taiwanese philosopher and former president of Fu Jen Catholic University. He is known for the official founder of Fu Jen School and Fu Jen Academia Catholica.

He obtained the bachelor's, master's and doctoral degree at Fu Jen Catholic University.

Honors
 Order of St. Gregory the Great
 Order of the Holy Sepulchre
 Order of Brilliant Star

References

External links
 輔大遴選第七任校長 101年2月接任

1943 births
Academic staff of Fu Jen Catholic University
Fu Jen Catholic University alumni
Presidents of universities and colleges in Taiwan
Taiwanese educators
Living people